Oakfield is an unincorporated community in Worth County, Georgia, United States. Oakfield has a post office with ZIP code 31772.

Oakfield was once an incorporated town; it was incorporated in 1900.

References

Former municipalities in Georgia (U.S. state)
Unincorporated communities in Worth County, Georgia
Unincorporated communities in Georgia (U.S. state)